Callilepis may refer to:
 Callilepis (spider), a genus of spiders of North America and Eurasia
 Callilepis (plant), a genus of plants of Southern Africa

See also 
 Callipelis, a genus of spiders of Iran
 Callipeltis, a genus of plants of the Mediterranean and West Asia